Kira Nagy (born 29 December 1977) is a former professional tennis player from Hungary. She won 18 singles and ten doubles titles at tournaments of the ITF Circuit.

Kira won her first match on the WTA Tour in 2007 at the Palermo Ladies Open, defeating German Tatjana Malek 6–2, 7–5, before losing to Émilie Loit.

She competed in the 2007 US Open, where she drew Venus Williams in the first round, losing 2–6, 1–6. This was her second Grand Slam tournament, after qualifying for the US Open in 2000.

Nagy retired from professional tennis 2014.

ITF Circuit finals

Singles: 33 (18 titles, 15 runner-ups)

Doubles: 22 (10 titles, 12 runner-ups)

ITF Junior Circuit

Singles (3–2)

Doubles (0–2)

External links
 
 
 

1979 births
Living people
Hungarian female tennis players
Olympic tennis players of Hungary
Tennis players at the 2004 Summer Olympics
Tennis players from Budapest
20th-century Hungarian women